Ina Forrest (born 25 May 1962) is a wheelchair curler selected to be second for Canada's team at the 2010 and 2014 Winter Paralympics, winning a gold medal on both occasions. She has also won a gold medal 3 times in the World Wheelchair Curling Championships, in 2009, 2011, and 2013. She was inducted into the Canadian Curling Hall of Fame in February 2016. She is a member of the Vernon Curling Club in Vernon, British Columbia.

Early curling career
She started wheelchair curling in 2004, and won silver in both the 2004 and 2005 Canadian National Wheelchair Curling Championships as a member of the British Columbia wheelchair curling team, before being named in 2006 to the Canadian Wheelchair Curling Team for whom she has since competed, in the next 9 World Wheelchair Curling Championships (starting in 2007) and the next 3 Winter Paralympics (starting in 2010).

Results

Family
She and her husband Curtis are small business owners. They have three children: Evany, Marlon and Connor.

Footnotes

References

External links

Profile at the Official Website for the 2010 Winter Paralympics in Vancouver

1962 births
Living people
Canadian women curlers
Canadian wheelchair curlers
Paralympic wheelchair curlers of Canada
Paralympic medalists in wheelchair curling
Paralympic gold medalists for Canada
Paralympic bronze medalists for Canada
Wheelchair curlers at the 2010 Winter Paralympics
Wheelchair curlers at the 2014 Winter Paralympics
Wheelchair curlers at the 2018 Winter Paralympics
Wheelchair curlers at the 2022 Winter Paralympics
Medalists at the 2010 Winter Paralympics
Medalists at the 2014 Winter Paralympics
Medalists at the 2018 Winter Paralympics
Medalists at the 2022 Winter Paralympics
Curlers from British Columbia
World wheelchair curling champions